Shah Yurdi or Shahyowrdi may refer to:
 Shah Yurdi, East Azerbaijan
 Shah Yurdi, Isfahan